Grindstone is the fourth studio album by the Norwegian band Shining, released in 2007 by Rune Grammofon.

Track listing

Notes
The title of track 10, "-... .- -.-. ...." spells out 'Bach' in morse code.
The title of track 11, "1:4:9" is the proportions of the black monolith from the film 2001: A Space Odyssey.
"Asa Nisi Masa" is a gibberish phrase found in the film 8½.  As a child, the main character Guido Anselmi is told by a fellow orphan that uttering this phrase at night will bring to life a certain portrait, and reveal a secret treasure hidden within the orphanage.
"In the Kingdom of Kitsch You Will Be a Monster" is a reference to the novel The Unbearable Lightness of Being and is also the title of Shining's previous record.

Personnel

Shining 
 Jørgen Munkeby – saxophone, flute, clarinet, guitars, vocals
 Andreas Hessen Schei – keyboards, synthesizer
 Morten Strøm – bass guitar
 Torstein Lofthus – drums

Additional personnel 
 Danny Young – gong 
 Kristoffer Myre Eng – organ 
 Åshild Skiri Refsdal – vocals 
 Kåre Chr. Vestrheim – production, mixing
 Hasse Rosbach – mixing, editing
 Mike Hartung – mixing
 Kim Hiorthøy – cover art

References

External links
 Last.fm album page

Shining (Norwegian band) albums
2007 albums